Allan Falk is an American bridge player.

Bridge accomplishments

Wins

 North American Bridge Championships (3)
 Blue Ribbon Pairs (1) 1997 
 Silodor Open Pairs (1) 1994 
 Wernher Open Pairs (1) 1997

Runners-up

 North American Bridge Championships (1)
 Grand National Teams (1) 1996

Notes

Year of birth missing (living people)
Living people
American contract bridge players